The enzyme 4-hydroxyphenylpyruvate decarboxylase catalyzes the chemical reaction

4-hydroxyphenylpyruvate  4-hydroxyphenylacetaldehyde + CO2

This enzyme belongs to the family of lyases, specifically the carboxy-lyases, which cleave carbon-carbon bonds.  The systematic name of this enzyme class is 4-hydroxyphenylpyruvate carboxy-lyase (4-hydroxyphenylacetaldehyde-forming). This enzyme is also called 4-hydroxyphenylpyruvate carboxy-lyase.

References

 

EC 4.1.1
Enzymes of unknown structure